Opharus consimilis is a moth of the family Erebidae. It was described by George Hampson in 1901. It is found in Mexico, Guatemala and Colombia.

References

Opharus
Moths described in 1901
Moths of North America
Moths of South America